Agnes was a wooden brigantine built in 1849 at Point Brenley, Nova Scotia. She was first registered in Pictou, Nova Scotia. Later acquired by owners in Sydney, she was wrecked on the north side of the Wollongong breakwater in New South Wales on the evening of 10 March 1877, when the wind changed while she was trying to enter the harbour of Wollongong.

References

Shipwrecks of the Illawarra Region
Ships built in Nova Scotia
1849 ships
Maritime incidents in March 1877
1851–1870 ships of Australia
1871–1900 ships of Australia
Merchant ships of Australia
Brigantines of Australia